Ann O'Donnell (born March 8, 1947) is an American fencer. She competed in the women's individual and team foil events at the 1972 and 1976 Summer Olympics.

References

External links
 

1947 births
Living people
American female foil fencers
Olympic fencers of the United States
Fencers at the 1972 Summer Olympics
Fencers at the 1976 Summer Olympics
Sportspeople from Bayonne, New Jersey
Pan American Games medalists in fencing
Pan American Games bronze medalists for the United States
Fencers at the 1975 Pan American Games
Fencers at the 1979 Pan American Games
21st-century American women